Eupithecia opicata is a moth in the family Geometridae. It is found in western China (Gansu).

The wingspan is about 21–22 mm. The forewings are mid brown and the hindwings are dirty white.

References

Moths described in 2004
opicata
Moths of Asia